is a Japanese professional baseball pitcher in Japan's Nippon Professional Baseball. He played for the Chunichi Dragons from 2002 to 2007 and from 2010 to 2012 and with the Hiroshima Toyo Carp in 2013, 2014, and 2016.

External links

NPB.com

1979 births
Living people
Baseball people from Osaka Prefecture
Asia University (Japan) alumni
Nippon Professional Baseball pitchers
Chunichi Dragons players
Hiroshima Toyo Carp players
People from Daitō, Osaka
Águilas Cibaeñas players
Japanese expatriate baseball players in the Dominican Republic